Aughawillan GAA is a Gaelic Athletic Association Gaelic football club in Lower Drumreilly parish, County Leitrim, Ireland.

Grounds

History
Aughawillan claim their origins from the Rory O'Donnells club which played in 1890. A team from the locality played under the names Kiltyhugh and Lower Drumreilly, winning the 1923 Leitrim Senior Football Championship.

A ladies' Gaelic football club was founded in the 1970s and has won nineteen county championships.

The current grounds opened in 1982.

Aughawillan have won 12 senior football county titles and have reached the final of the Connacht Senior Club Football Championship on two occasions, in 1992 and 1994.

Achievements
 Connacht Senior Club Football Championship: Runner-Up 1992, 1994 
 Leitrim Senior Football Championship: Winners (12) 1923, 1976, 1978, 1983, 1984, 1989, 1992, 1993, 1994, 2014, 2016, 2018

Notable players
Mickey Quinn
Frank Darcy
Declan Darcy

References

External links
 Official website

Gaelic games clubs in County Leitrim
Gaelic football clubs in County Leitrim